AsiaOne is Singapore's first pure play digital content platform, serving readers primarily in Singapore, Malaysia, and Hong Kong. AsiaOne was first launched in 1995 by Singapore Press Holdings and is currently a joint venture between mm2 Asia and SPH Media Trust. 

On 5 June 2000, SPH AsiaOne Ltd was listed on the Singapore Exchange. It was delisted on 24 January 2002.

AsiaOne was revamped in July 2021, focusing on being "Off Centre, On Trend", that is, offering the reader a fresh perspective of what's happening packaged in a relatable way that matters. The website is one of the top news and information websites in Singapore by readership.

AsiaOne won the Silver award for the Best News Website Or Mobile Service for its NewsLite service in 2021 at the WAN-IFRA Digital Media Awards Asia 2021.

Content 
AsiaOne initially started as a news aggregator covering news from across the Southeast Asian region. Today, over 90% of its content is organically created by a team of in-house writers and video producer. It's core verticals are News, Entertainment, Lifestyle and Digital Culture. In April 2021, AsiaOne added a new sustainability-focused vertical, EarthOne. The vertical house articles that discuss climate change and sustainability issues. 

AsiaOne believes that there are multiple ways to tell a story, each with its own unique spin and audience. It just takes effort to find a good angle. 

News is curated and reported to be relevant to the everyday Gen Z and Millennial person. 

Entertainment focuses on news from Asian music, TV & movies, including concerts, celebrity updates and interviews. 

Lifestyle brings content on food, finance, travel and health to share what's new and trending. 

Over 60% of AsiaOne's readers are between the ages of 18 to 44.

AsiaOne's website is free-to-use, and has a social media reach on Facebook, Instagram, TikTok, YouTube and Dailymotion. 

AsiaOne's social media performance includes over 45 million reach on Facebook, with an average 10 million monthly Facebook engagements, and over 9.5 million monthly minutes viewed via FB watch.

Management and staff 
Low Huan Ping was the founding CEO of AsiaOne, the current CEO is Sean Ler. 

The current Head of Content is Tan Thiam Peng.

Previous editors include Margaret Thomas, Paul Jansen, Irene Ngoo, and Adrian Tay.

References

External links 
 

Internet properties established in 1995
Singaporean companies established in 1995
1995 establishments in Singapore
Mass media companies established in 1995
Companies formerly listed on the Singapore Exchange
SPH Media Trust